Old Brownsboro Place is a home rule-class city in Jefferson County, Kentucky, United States, and a part of the united Metro government. The population was 353 at the 2010 census.

Geography
Old Brownsboro Place is located in northeastern Jefferson County at  (38.289169, -85.613111). It is bordered to the north by Spring Valley, to the south by Bancroft, and otherwise by consolidated Louisville/Jefferson County. The northern boundary of the city follows Kentucky Route 22 (Old Brownsboro Road).

Goose Creek, a north-flowing tributary of the Ohio River, touches the eastern edge of the community.

Demographics

As of the census of 2000, there were 384 people, 146 households, and 125 families residing in the city. The racial makeup of the city was 95.57% White, 1.82% African American, 1.82% Asian, and 0.78% from two or more races. Hispanic or Latino of any race were 1.30% of the population.

There were 146 households, out of which 28.1% had children under the age of 18 living with them, 80.1% were married couples living together, 4.8% had a female householder with no husband present, and 13.7% were non-families. 12.3% of all households were made up of individuals, and 9.6% had someone living alone who was 65 years of age or older. The average household size was 2.63 and the average family size was 2.84.

In the city, the population was spread out, with 21.4% under the age of 18, 6.0% from 18 to 24, 18.8% from 25 to 44, 34.6% from 45 to 64, and 19.3% who were 65 years of age or older. The median age was 47 years. For every 100 females, there were 111.0 males. For every 100 females age 18 and over, there were 101.3 males.

The median income for a household in the city was $95,998, and the median income for a family was $103,216. Males had a median income of $74,750 versus $45,000 for females. The per capita income for the city was $46,334. None of the population or families were below the poverty line.

References

Cities in Jefferson County, Kentucky
Cities in Kentucky
Populated places established in 1977
1977 establishments in Kentucky